Ghurak-e Vosta (also Romanized as Ghūrak-e Vosţá; also known as Ghūrak-e Mīānī) is a village in Babuyi Rural District, Basht District, Basht County, Kohgiluyeh and Boyer-Ahmad Province, Iran. At the 2006 census, its population was 19, in 5 families.

References 

Populated places in Basht County